Hidalgo Municipality (also, Villa Hidalgo) is a municipality located in the Mexican state of Tamaulipas. El Chorrito is a centre of pilgrimage in the municipality.

Climate
The prevailing climate in Hidalgo is sub-humid and warm. Average rainfall is 700 millimeters, the minimum temperature is 2° C and maximum of 41° C.

References

External links
Gobierno Municipal de Hidalgo Official website

Municipalities of Tamaulipas